Rashid Ali Omar (born 13 January 1961) is a Tanzanian CUF politician and Member of Parliament for Kojani constituency since 2010.

References

Living people
1961 births
Civic United Front MPs
Tanzanian MPs 2010–2015
Utaani Secondary School alumni
Shenge Juu Secondary School alumni
Zanzibari politicians